Nephopterix furella is a species of snout moth in the genus Nephopterix. It was described by Embrik Strand in 1918. It is found in Taiwan.

References

Moths described in 1918
Phycitini